Marcin Folc (born 23 October 1981 in Jawor) is a Polish footballer.

References
 

1981 births
Living people
Polish footballers
GKS Tychy players
Widzew Łódź players
RKS Radomsko players
Piast Gliwice players
KSZO Ostrowiec Świętokrzyski players
Zagłębie Sosnowiec players
Tur Turek players
Górnik Wałbrzych players
Association football forwards
People from Jawor
Sportspeople from Lower Silesian Voivodeship